Somniosus is a widely distributed genus of deepwater dogfish sharks in the family Somniosidae.

Species
 Somniosus antarcticus Whitley, 1939 (southern sleeper shark)
 †Somniosus gonzalezi Welton & Goedert, 2016 – fossil, Oligocene
 Somniosus longus Tanaka, 1912 (frog shark)
 Somniosus microcephalus (Bloch & J. G. Schneider, 1801) (Greenland shark)
 Somniosus pacificus Bigelow & Schroeder, 1944 (Pacific sleeper shark)
 Somniosus rostratus A. Risso, 1827 (little sleeper shark)
 Somniosus sp. A Not yet described (longnose sleeper shark)

See also

 List of prehistoric cartilaginous fish

References

 
Extant Oligocene first appearances
Shark genera
Taxa named by Charles Alexandre Lesueur